Hamilton C. Jones III House, also known as The Stone House, is a historic home located at Charlotte, Mecklenburg County, North Carolina. It was built between 1929 and 1931, and is a massive, -story, four bay, granite, Tudor Revival style dwelling. It is constructed of four-inch terra cotta tiles sheathed in ashlar granite, stucco, and half-timbering, and has a side-gable roof with dormers. It is a -story service ell. Also on the property is a contributing playhouse. It was the home of Congressman Hamilton C. Jones.

It was listed on the National Register of Historic Places in 2002.

References

Houses on the National Register of Historic Places in North Carolina
Tudor Revival architecture in North Carolina
Houses completed in 1931
Houses in Charlotte, North Carolina
National Register of Historic Places in Mecklenburg County, North Carolina